All the Beautiful Things is a 2014 American documentary film written and directed by John D. Harkrider. The film premiered in competition category of U.S. Documentary Competition program at the 2014 Sundance Film Festival on January 20, 2014.

Premise
The film deals with relationship between two friends John and Barron. Barron was falsely accused of rape and with John's betrayal, face life in jail. Years later they met again to repair their damaged friendship.

Reception
The film received mixed reviews from critics. John DeFore in his review for The Hollywood Reporter said that "A pretty but enormously self-indulgent project that wants us to play therapist." Sean P. Means of The Salt Lake Tribune gave the film a negative review by saying that "This material might have worked as a stage play, but as a contrived "documentary" it feels phony and self-absorbed."

References

External links

2014 films
American documentary films
2014 documentary films
2010s English-language films
2010s American films